Osteochilus brachynotopteroides is a fresh water fish in the family Cyprinidae from Southeast Asia. It occurs in the lower Mekong Basin and is present in Laos, Thailand, and Vietnam; it is expected to occur in Cambodia but has not been found there.

Osteochilus brachynotopteroides grows to  TL. It is a rare species that seems to prefer hill streams and highland lakes. It is probably present, although not documented, in local subsistence fisheries.

References 

Osteochilus
Fish of the Mekong Basin
Fish of Laos
Fish of Thailand
Fish of Vietnam
Taxa named by Pierre Chevey
Fish described in 1934